The 1948 Wisconsin gubernatorial election was held on November 2, 1948.

Incumbent Republican Governor Oscar Rennebohm defeated Democratic nominee Carl W. Thompson with 54.09% of the vote.

Primary elections
Primary elections were held on September 21, 1948.

Democratic primary

Candidates
William D. Carroll, former State Senator
Carl W. Thompson, attorney

Results

Republican primary

Candidates
Ralph M. Immell, unsuccessful candidate for Republican nomination for Governor in 1946
Oscar Rennebohm, incumbent Governor

Results

General election

Candidates
Major party candidates
Carl W. Thompson, Democratic
Oscar Rennebohm, Republican

Other candidates
Henry J. Berquist, People's Progressive, candidate for Lieutenant Governor in 1942
James E. Boulton, Socialist Workers, industrial worker, candidate for Mayor of Milwaukee in March 1948
Georgia Cozzini, Socialist Labor, candidate for Governor in 1942 and 1944
Walter H. Uphoff, Socialist, candidate for Governor in 1946

Results

References

Bibliography
 
 

1948
Wisconsin
Gubernatorial
Wisconsin gubernatorial election